Aleksey Bochkov (21 January 1970 – 12 April 2015) was a Russian cyclist. He competed in the individual road race at the 1992 Summer Olympics for the Unified Team.

References

1970 births
2015 deaths
Russian male cyclists
Olympic cyclists of the Unified Team
Cyclists at the 1992 Summer Olympics
Place of birth missing